A workbench is a sturdy table at which manual work is done.

Workbench may also refer to:

 Workbench (woodworking), a specialized table used by woodworkers
 Workbench (AmigaOS), the native graphical user interface for the Amiga computer
 MySQL Workbench, a visual database design tool for the MySQL database system
 WorkBench, a tool for preparing text for use in BitFunnel, the search engine indexing algorithm